Christopher Anthony Holt (born April 19, 1979) is an American professional baseball former pitcher and current pitching coach for the Baltimore Orioles of Major League Baseball (MLB).

Biography
Holt attended Saint Joseph's College of Maine and transferred to Flagler College, where he played college baseball as a pitcher. The Pittsburgh Pirates selected him in the 21st round of the 2002 MLB draft. He played at the Class A Short Season level in 2002 for the Williamsport Crosscutters. Released by Pittsburgh in 2003, Holt pitched in Austria in 2004 before becoming a coach at Flagler College in 2005. He coached at Ponte Vedra High School from 2009 to 2011. He then quit his teaching job to focus on coaching full-time.

Holt met Doug White of the Houston Astros organization in December 2012, which led to his hiring as a coach in the Astros organization in 2014. Mike Elias hired him for the Baltimore Orioles' organization in the 2018–19 offseason as their minor-league pitching coordinator. Holt became the Orioles' major league pitching coach in 2021, while also carrying the title of director of pitching for the entire organization.

References

External links

Living people
1979 births
Baltimore Orioles coaches
Major League Baseball pitching coaches
Sportspeople from Portland, Maine
Williamsport Crosscutters players